is a passenger railway station located in the city of Maibara, Shiga Prefecture, Japan, operated by the Central Japan Railway Company (JR Tōkai).

Lines

Station layout
The station consists of two island platforms connected by a footbridge. The station is staffed.

Platforms

Adjacent stations

|-
!colspan=5|Central Japan Railway Company

History
Kashiwabara Station opened on February 21, 1900 on the Japanese Government Railway (JGR) Tōkaidō Line.  The station came under the aegis of the Central Japan Railway Company on April 1, 1987 due to the privatization of JNR. 

Station numbering was introduced to the section of the Tōkaidō Line operated by JR Central in March 2018; Kashiwabara Station was assigned station number CA80.

Passenger statistics
In fiscal 2019, the station was used by an average of 259 passengers daily (boarding passengers only).

Surrounding area
Tokugen-in, Buddhist temple with National Historic Site cemetery of the Kyōgoku clan
Maibara City Kashiwabara Administrative Service Center
Maibara City Kashiwabara Junior High School
Maibara City Kashiwabara Elementary School
Kashiwabara-juku History Museum

See also
List of railway stations in Japan

References

Yoshikawa, Fumio. Tokaido-sen 130-nen no ayumi. Grand-Prix Publishing (2002) .

External links

Railway stations in Japan opened in 1900
Railway stations in Mie Prefecture
Tōkaidō Main Line
Stations of Central Japan Railway Company
Maibara, Shiga